Carl Ström (18 June 1888 – 18 November 1957) was a Swedish film actor. He appeared in more than 100 films between 1923 and 1955.

Selected filmography

 Iron Will (1923)
 Gustaf Wasa (1928)
 Cavaliers of the Crown (1930)
 His Life's Match (1932)
 Man's Way with Women (1934)
 The Atlantic Adventure (1934)
 Melody of the Sea (1934)
 Walpurgis Night (1935)
 Ocean Breakers (1935)
 Adventure (1936)
 South of the Highway (1936)
 Johan Ulfstjerna (1936)
 Conscientious Objector Adolf (1936)
 The Andersson Family (1937)
 John Ericsson, Victor of Hampton Roads (1937)
 Sara Learns Manners (1937)
 Dollar (1938)
 Circus (1939)
 Kalle's Inn (1939)
 The People of Högbogården (1939)
 June Nights (1940)
 Hanna in Society (1940)
 The Talk of the Town (1941)
 The Fight Continues (1941)
 Bright Prospects (1941)
 Goransson's Boy (1941)
 Scanian Guerilla (1941)
 The Train Leaves at Nine (1941)
 Ride Tonight! (1942)
 Tomorrow's Melody (1942)
 The Case of Ingegerd Bremssen (1942)
 It Is My Music (1942)
 Night in Port (1943)
 The Brothers' Woman (1943)
 There's a Fire Burning (1943)
 Imprisoned Women (1943)
 The Emperor of Portugallia (1944)
 We Need Each Other (1944)
 His Excellency (1944)
 The Old Clock at Ronneberga (1944)
 The Girl and the Devil (1944)
 The Invisible Wall (1944)
 Oss tjuvar emellan eller En burk ananas (1945)
Widower Jarl (1945)
 Sunshine Follows Rain (1946)
 When the Meadows Blossom (1946)
 Brita in the Merchant's House (1946)
 Dynamite (1947)
 The People of Simlang Valley (1947)
 The Night Watchman's Wife (1947)
 The Girl from the Marsh Croft (1947)
 Främmande hamn (1948)
 Robinson in Roslagen (1948)
 Eva (1948)
 I Am with You (1948)
 On These Shoulders (1948)
 Lars Hård (1948)
 The Quartet That Split Up (1950)
 While the City Sleeps (1950)
 Divorced (1951)
 All the World's Delights (1953)
 The Beat of Wings in the Night (1953)
 Simon the Sinner (1954)
 Paradise (1955)
 The Girl in the Rain (1955)
 The Light from Lund (1955)
 Uncle's (1955)

References

External links

1888 births
1957 deaths
Swedish male film actors
Swedish male silent film actors
20th-century Swedish male actors